Borchard is a German language surname. It stems from the male given name Burchard – and may refer to:
Adolphe Borchard (1882–1967), French pianist and composer
August Borchard (1864–1940), German physician and surgeon
Beatrix Borchard (1950), German musicologist and author
Edwin Borchard (1884–1951), international legal scholar and jurist
Ian Borchard (1957), former Australian rules footballer
Joe Borchard (1978),  American former Major League Baseball (MLB) outfielder
Leo Borchard (1899–1945), German-Russian conductor
Ruth Borchard (1910–2000), British writer

References

German-language surnames
Surnames from given names